Men of Deeds (Romanian: Oameni de treaba) is a 2022 Romanian-Bulgarian black comedy-drama film directed by , starring , , Anghel Damian, Crina Semciuc, Daniel Busuioc, Oana Tudor and Vitalie Bichir.

Cast
  as Ilie
  as Mayor Constantin
 Anghel Damian as Vali
 Crina Semciuc as Cristina
 Daniel Busuioc as The Priest
 Oana Tudor as Mona
 Vitalie Bichir as Cornel

Release
The film was premiered at the Sarajevo Film Festival on 14 August 2022.

Reception
Guy Lodge of Variety wrote that "it’s largely thanks to Postelnicu’s tricky performance — equal parts pathetic and sympathetic, with a genuine, soulful sadness beneath the amusing tics of his wheezing vocal delivery and gurning body language — that Men of Deeds pulls off its odd, queasily tragicomic tonal shuffle as well as it does, building on the already unflattering boys-in-blue portrait painted by Two Lottery Tickets."

Neil Young of Screen Daily called the film's climax "effectively jarring".

References

External links
 
 
2022 films
2022 black comedy films
2022 comedy-drama films
Romanian comedy-drama films
Bulgarian comedy-drama films
2020s Romanian-language films